A packhorse bridge is a bridge intended to carry packhorses (horses loaded with sidebags or panniers) across a river or stream. Typically a packhorse bridge consists of one or more narrow (one horse wide) masonry arches, and has low parapets so as not to interfere with the panniers borne by the horses. Multi-arched examples sometimes have triangular cutwaters that are extended upward to form pedestrian refuges.

Packhorse bridges were often built on the trade routes (often called packhorse routes) that formed major transport arteries across Europe and Great Britain until the coming of the turnpike roads and canals in the 18th century. Before the road-building efforts of Napoleon, all crossings of the Alps were on packhorse trails. Travellers' carriages were dismantled and transported over the mountain passes by ponies and mule trains.

Definition
In the British Isles at least, the definition of a packhorse bridge is somewhat nebulous. Ernest Hinchliffe discusses the difficulty of defining a true packhorse bridge in A Guide to the Packhorse Bridges of England. He claims that "before the eighteenth century bridges were described as 'horse bridges' or 'cart bridges'" and his strict definition excludes the latter. He suggests that a classic packhorse bridge should generally be:
built before 1800;
on a recognised packhorse route.

He categorises the 190 English bridges listed in his book into three groups:
Group 2: bridges that fail one or other of the above criteria, but which are generally referred to as packhorse bridges;
Group 3: bridges sometimes claimed as packhorse bridges, but dismissed as such by the author.

The difficulty of classification is illustrated by Moulton Bridge in Suffolk, which Hinchliffe places in Group 1 but which English Heritage describes as "perhaps not strictly a packhorse bridge since it was wide enough to take carts".

List of packhorse bridges in the British Isles
The following list includes all listed buildings described as packhorse bridges by English Heritage, Cadw, or Historic Scotland; all 106 of Hinchliffe's Group 1 bridges in England; and certain other candidates. (For England, Hinchliffe's Group numbers are given as superscripts after the bridge name.)

England

Isle of Man

Scotland

Wales

References

 
Footbridges
Deck arch bridges